The Sir Thomas Lipton Trophy was an association football competition that took place twice, in Turin, Italy, in 1909 and 1911. It is regarded as an early European trophy.

It is predated by the Torneo Internazionale Stampa Sportiva, which was hosted in 1908 in Turin, and the Football World Championship, which took place between 1887 and 1902. Also seen as an international competition, but with the noted lack of an England team, Lipton in partnership with the Italian royal family, wanted to go one further and make a more complete tournament. While the actual FIFA World Cup features international teams from around the world, the Lipton Cup, an invitational, only featured a few club sides from Europe.

Overview 
Italy, Germany and Switzerland sent their most prestigious club sides to the competition, but The Football Association of England refused to be associated with it and declined the offer to send a team. Not wishing to have England unrepresented in the competition, Thomas Lipton invited West Auckland FC, an amateur side from County Durham and mostly made up of coal miners, to take part.  The reason why this team was selected is unknown.  Some verbal tradition in West Auckland was that the FA intended to send Woolwich Arsenal but West Auckland were invited instead as they shared the same initials.

West Auckland won the tournament and returned to Italy in 1911 to defend their title. In this second competition, West Auckland beat the then amateur team Juventus 6–1 in the final, and were awarded the trophy outright. The development of football on other continents: Asia, Africa and the Americas was not very advanced and Europe was where the major football was happening.

In January 1994 the original trophy, which was being held in West Auckland Working Men's Club, was stolen. An exact replica of the original trophy was commissioned and is now held by West Auckland FC.

1909 tournament

Participants

Notes

Results

Semi-finals

Third place match

Final

1911 tournament

Participants

Results

Semi-finals

Third place match

Final 

West Auckland Town: J Robinson; Tom Wilson, Charlie Cassidy; Andy "Chips" Appleby, Michael Alderson, Bob "Drol" Moore; Fred Dunn, Joes Recastle, Bob Jones, Bob Guthrie, Charlie "Dirty" Hogg, T Riley, John Warick

Officials: M S C Barron, E Meek, W Nolli, R Hodgson, R Chamberlain

In popular culture
Moving Adverts of Dubai has worked with video maker Rob Kilburn on an account of the story, Our Cup of Tea.

Tyne Tees Television produced a dramatisation of the story in 1982, The World Cup: A Captain's Tale.

See also
 Copa Lipton
 Lipton Challenge Cup
 1895 World Championship
 Football World Championship
 Évence Coppée Trophy

Further reading
 The Miners' Triumph: The First English World Cup Win, Martin Connolly,   Oakleaf Publishing (self-published) (2014)

References

External links 
 Our Cup of Tea, the story of England's first world cup win – Narrated by Tim Healy on YouTube 

1908–09 in European football
1910–11 in European football
Defunct Italian football friendly trophies
Defunct international club association football competitions in Europe
1908–09 in Italian football
1908–09 in English football
1908–09 in Swiss football
1910–11 in Italian football
1910–11 in English football
1910–11 in Swiss football
1908–09 in German football